Abarth Simca GT refers to a number of sports cars produced by Italian manufacturer Abarth between 1962 and 1965.

The Abarth-Simca GT represent a range of cars designed by the Italian manufacturer Abarth following a cooperation agreement concluded with Simca in 1961.

The Abarth-Simca GT range includes 3 distinct models:

1300 GT, in coupe and spyder versions,
1600 GT
2000 GT

These cars are all intended solely for motor racing, studied and built by Abarth, based on the chassis of the Simca 1000.

Origin of the Simca 1000
The Simca 1000 is in fact the fruit of the "Fiat 122" project, the one which was to be the replacement for the Fiat 600 but which was not accepted by the general management of Fiat who preferred the "100G" project to it, the one which would become the Fiat 850. During a visit to Turin, in 1957, by Henri Théodore Pigozzi, boss of Simca, then a subsidiary of Fiat, he was seduced by the plaster prototype resulting from this refused study and obtained to recover the project to carry it out in France 1.

The Simca 1000 benefited from bodywork designed in Turin by Mario Revelli de Beaumont, a famous Italian designer, and sees its engine placed at the rear according to the classic design that Fiat developed with its Fiat 600s and carried over to the new 850. It is an "all in the back" with a four-wheel independent suspension (coil springs at the rear and leaf springs at the front) and a longitudinal four-cylinder engine in rear overhang with a four-speed synchronized gearbox. It was also the last car to receive the contribution of the Fiat design office for its design very inspired by the Fiat 850. From 1963, Fiat, which had the agreement of the French government to buy Citroën, had begun to withdraw from Simca by selling a first part to Chrysler.

Abarth's intervention
To reinforce the image of the brand during the launch of the new Simca 1000, the French manufacturer, under the direction of Henri Théodore Pigozzi, wanted to rely on a sports version as Fiat had been doing for years in Italy.

At the start of 1961, an agreement was signed between the two manufacturers for the supply of:

a sports car built from the production saloon, but with a 1,150 cc engine,
of a coupé intended for competition, based on the platform of the production car but adapted for the occasion and fitted with a new Abarth-designed engine.
This project was the first of its kind entrusted to Abarth by the manufacturer. Never before had Abarth had to manage a complete project; most of the time, he was “content” with preparing or modifying existing cars.

The Abarth Simca 1300 GT is a car intended solely for motor racing produced by the Italian manufacturer Abarth in 1962, based on the Simca 1000.

History
This car was presented at the Geneva Motor Show on March 15, 1962. It has the factory code "AB 130".

Abarth, therefore, designed the new Abarth Simca 1300 GT which was in fact a real racing car, homologated in Grand Touring on October 8, 1962. The car was officially presented at the Geneva Motor Show on March 15, 1962. Its engine was a Fiat-Abarth 1288 cc with dry sump and two overhead camshafts driven by two chains, fed by two Weber 45 DCOE twin-barrel carburetors, developing 127 hp with a compression ratio of 10.4:1. A real feat was born with a power of 100 hp per liter.

The bodywork signed Becaris, took up the line of the Fiat Abarth 1000 which had won an award for its superb and aerodynamic line.

Drivers immediately complained about the car's random behavior, demanding a more performance-tuned chassis, which was not possible, given Simca's budget constraints; this forced Abarth to find tricks to obtain sufficient handling.

The car was homologated in the Grand Touring category on October 8, 1962. His baptism in the race dates from April 14, 1962, during the Lure hill climb, near Dijon. Of the 58 cars entered, there were 3 Abarth Simca 1300 GTs, one with Spider Sport bodywork on a tubular chassis and two in Coupé version, including the one driven by Jean Guichet who obtained the best lap time in practice. The winner was Gianni Balzarini aboard the 1300 GT Spider; the two 1300 GT Coupes took second and third place overall. The Abarth legend was then affirmed in France where Abarth would reign supreme.

The Spyder version
This Spyder version was not part of the agreement with Simca. It is on the initiative of Carlo Abarth that we owe this tray which rested on an Abarth tubular chassis. The car won the race on its first participation. Simca did not follow up on this version. The car is designated under the internal code AB 130S.

Abarth Simca 1600 GT

This car was presented on February 15, 1963. It was directly derived from the previous 1300 GT, with a first intervention on the chassis coming from the Simca 1000, which was from the start, the weak point of the car. The engine, derived from the Fiat-Abarth of the 1300 GT had benefited from an increase in the bore from 76 to 86 mm which authorized the installation of a second spark plug on each cylinder. It also benefited from a 6-speed gearbox. Its life will be very short because the International Sports Federation announced, during the summer of 1963, the abolition of the Grand Touring 1600 cm3 category of competitions. Carlo Abarth, therefore, had to resolve to bet everything on the 2000 GT, which would be the last model in this range.

After the racing exploits of the 1300 GT, Carlo Abarth and Henri Théodore Pigozzi agreed to continue this cooperation but let Abarth improve the chassis to be used for a new, more powerful car. After a very brief transition with the 1600 GT, it will be the 2000 GT, presented at the Geneva Motor Show on March 15, 1963. It bears the factory code AB 136.

Once again, the leaders of Simca forced Abarth to use the chassis, the gearbox, and the suspensions, deeply modified by Abarth, of the Simca 1000, which had already penalized the 1300 GT in the race and which went, even more, limit the sporting pretensions of the 2000 GT. The gearbox was the weakest point because of its proven fragility, even on the basic production model.

The delivery of the first copies of the car to individuals began in April 1964. At the same time, Abarth was developing the modifications that it was going to offer directly to its experienced customers and drivers who would use this car in international competition. The development of the car knew no end. In fact, during the Bologna Passo Della Raticosa hill climb, Abarth used a car with a shortened front end, dubbed “Muso Corto,” which would be used on all cars delivered to customers.

When the new American management of Simca officially took over the reins of the company on January 1, 1964, the agreement signed with Abarth was terminated with effect from December 31, 1964. This proved to be a godsend for Abarth, which was able to fit its own gearbox and win many races while giving Simca the benefit of free publicity.

In 1966, the rules of the Fédération Internationale de Sport Automobile changed again and the Abarth 2000 GT had to move from the GT category to the Sport category; it included many experienced competitors who perfectly mastered the regulations of this category and its tricks. The Abarth Course team used the 2000 GT until the end of the 1968 season, a car which was replaced by the Fiat Abarth 2000 Sport.

References

Abarth vehicles
Fiat vehicles
Simca vehicles
Cars introduced in 1962
Sports cars
Rear-wheel-drive vehicles
Cars of Italy